The Armstrong River is a watercourse in Manitoba, Canada, that flows east into the Nelson River. Like the nearby Armstrong Lake, it was named after H. W. D. Armstrong, who was chief engineer of construction on the Hudson Bay Railway in 1912.

See also
List of rivers of Manitoba

References

Rivers of Manitoba
Tributaries of Hudson Bay